Yel Cheshmeh-ye Jadid (also Romanized as Yel Cheshmeh-ye Jadīd and Yelcheshmeh-ye Jadīd) is a village in Zavkuh Rural District, Pishkamar District, Kalaleh County, Golestan Province, Iran. At the 2006 census, its population was 412, in 56 families.

References 

Populated places in Kalaleh County